Mark Salmon may refer to:

 Mark Salmon (footballer) (born 1988), Irish footballer
 Mark Salmon (darts player) (born 1963), Welsh darts player
Mark Salmon (surf lifesaver) (born 1967), Australian surf lifesaver